The Port of Genoa it is one of the most important seaports in Italy, in competition with the ports of Marseille and Barcelona in the Mediterranean Sea. With a trade volume of 51.6 million tonnes, it is the busiest port of Italy after the port of Trieste by cargo tonnage.

Notably the port was used for dismantling the Costa Concordia following the Costa Concordia disaster.

Structural characteristics

The Port of Genoa covers an area of about 700 hectares of land and 500 hectares on water, stretching for over 22 kilometres along the coastline, with 47 km of maritime ways and 30 km of operative quays.

There are 4 main entrances:

 the Eastern inlet, affording access to the old port, to the shipyards, and to the terminals of Sampierdarena
 the Western (Cornigliano) inlet, used mostly by ships operating at the ILVA quays
 the Multedo entrance, for ships operating in the oil terminals and to the Fincantieri shipyards
 the Pra' entrance, at the western end of the port, for ships operating at the container terminal

Passenger terminals
The quays of the passenger terminals extend over an area of 250 thousand square metres, with 5 equipped berths for cruise vessels and 13 for ferries, for an annual capacity of 4 million ferry passengers, 1.5 million cars and 250,000 trucks.

The historical maritime station of Ponte dei Mille is today a technologically advanced cruise terminal, with facilities designed after the world's most modern airports, in order to ensure fast embarking and disembarking of latest generation ships carrying thousand passengers.

A third cruise terminal is currently under construction in the redesigned area of Ponte Parodi, once a quay used for grain traffic.

Lighthouses

Marinas

Besides the container and the passenger terminals, the shipyards and the other industrial and cargo facilities, in the port area there are also several marinas, where many sailboats and yachts are moored.
 The marina of the Exhibition centre (305 berths).
 The marina Duca degli Abruzzi, home of the Yacht Club Italiano (350 berths)
 The marina Molo Vecchio, in the area of the old harbor (160 berths for yachts up to 150 metres)
 The marina Porto antico (280 berths up to 60 metres)
 The marina Genova Aeroporto (500 berths, with new facilities for superyachts)
 The marina of Pra', in the area of the old Pra' beach, now "Fascia di Rispetto di Pra'" (1000 berths)

References

External links

Transport in Genoa
Buildings and structures in Genoa
Ports and harbours of Italy
Tourist attractions in Genoa